Allylmagnesium bromide is a Grignard reagent used for introducing the allyl group. It is commonly available as a solution in diethyl ether. It may be synthesized by treatment of magnesium with allyl bromide while maintaining the reaction temperature below 0 °C to suppress formation of hexadiene. Allyl chloride can also be used in place of the bromide to give allylmagnesium chloride.  These reagents are used to prepare metal allyl complexes.

References

Further reading
 

Organomagnesium compounds
Allyl compounds
Bromides